The city of Ottawa, Canada held municipal elections on December 3, 1962.

Charlotte Whitton is re-elected as mayor, defeating former controller and owner of the Ottawa Rough Riders, Sam Berger in a re-match of the 1960 election.

Mayor of Ottawa

Referendums

Ottawa Board of Control
(4 elected)

City council

(2 elected from each ward)

References
Ottawa Journal, December 4, 1962

Municipal elections in Ottawa
1962 elections in Canada
1960s in Ottawa
1962 in Ontario
December 1962 events in Canada